Simeon Taylor Price, Jr. (May 16, 1882 – March 16, 1945) was an American golfer who competed in the 1904 Summer Olympics. He was born in Maine and died in Washington, D.C. In 1904 he was part of the American team which won the bronze medal. He finished 20th in this competition. In the individual competition he finished 19th in the qualification and was eliminated in the first round of the match play.

References

External links
 Profile

American male golfers
Amateur golfers
Golfers at the 1904 Summer Olympics
Olympic bronze medalists for the United States in golf
Medalists at the 1904 Summer Olympics
Golfers from Maine
1882 births
1945 deaths